Euriphene adumbrata is a butterfly in the family Nymphalidae. It is found in the Democratic Republic of the Congo, from the eastern part of the country to Kivu.

References

Butterflies described in 1928
Euriphene
Endemic fauna of the Democratic Republic of the Congo
Butterflies of Africa